Pantabangan Dam is an earth-fill embankment dam on the Pampanga River located in Pantabangan in Nueva Ecija province of the Philippines. The multi-purpose dam provides water for irrigation and hydroelectric power generation while its reservoir, Pantabangan Lake, affords flood control. The reservoir is considered one of the largest in Southeast Asia and also one of the cleanest in the Philippines. Construction on the dam began in 1971 and it was completed in 1974.

History
In May 1969, the Congress of the Philippines authorized the development of the Pampanga Basin with Republic Act No. 5499. In October of that year, detailed studies of the Pantabangan site were carried out and lasted two years. By June 11, 1971, Pantabangan was an old town of around 300 years old. President Ferdinand Marcos and many others arrived for a ground breaking ceremony in Palayupay, Pantabangan, Nueva Ecija, to signal the beginning of the construction of Pantabangan Dam. The dam went into operation in February 1977 and was completed later in May. Approximately 1,300 people were relocated from the dam's reservoir zone.

Design
The spillway is a chute-type controlled by three radial gates but equipped with an overflow section as well. The reservoir's life is estimated at 107 years due to silt from denudation. The dam was designed to withstand an intensity 8 earthquake.

The power house is located at the base of the main dam and contains two 60 MW Francis turbine-generators for an installed capacity of 120 MW. Each turbine receives water via a  diameter penstock.

References

Dams in the Philippines
Hydroelectric power plants in the Philippines
Earth-filled dams
Dams completed in 1977
Sierra Madre (Philippines)
Buildings and structures in Nueva Ecija
Tourist attractions in Nueva Ecija
1977 establishments in the Philippines